The Milang railway line was a branch line, now closed, of the former South Australian Railways that  left the mainline to Victor Harbor at the farming locality of Sandergrove, 9 km (6 mi) south of Strathalbyn and 89.7 km (55.75 mi) by rail from Adelaide. From there it proceeded in a south-easterly direction for 13.1 km (8.1 mi) to the riverport of Milang on Lake Alexandrina, in the estuary of the River Murray. The line was opened on 17 December 1884; it was formally closed on 17 June 1970. The route is now a "rail trail" that is popular with hikers. The precincts of the former Milang station house a railway museum that includes an innovative locomotive driving simulator for visitors to operate. Onsite is a centre for South Australian historical light railways.

The new river trade 
During the latter half of the 19th century, many moves and counter-moves, in trade and politics, were prompted by inter-colonial rivalry and fierce competition. Boat-borne trade on the Murray–Darling river system, which started in 1853, was no exception. The creation of the Milang railway line only occurred after a third of a century of such contention – and it was parliamentary influence of the man who founded Milang, rather than economics, that brought it into being. 

Two driving forces in the river trade were the need to reduce the cost of transporting heavy produce, especially wool, to seaports and to maximise state governments' customs revenue. State governments, pastoralists, businessmen and boat owners were quick to seize any competitive advantage.

Before the arrival of the river boats, of which there would be more than 100, goods and produce were moved by rough tracks using bullocks or horses and wagons – a slow and arduous process. River travel along the Murray and Darling allowed traders to transport perishable goods to pastoralists on inland properties. In turn, pastoralists could ship their valuable wool clips much faster to ocean ports for export to the mills of Britain.

A railway to the wrong place

In 1853, after the navigability of the river 2400 km (1500 mi) upstream to its junction with the Darling River had been proved, the estuarine town of Goolwa Goolwa monopolised South Australia's river trade with Victoria and New South Wales, and the town was to enjoy this primacy for 25 years. 

The destination for agricultural produce (mainly wool) carried down the river was Port Adelaide, before shipping to Britain. In the absence of railway transport in South Australia, boats had to risk the hazards of sandbars and currents at the river mouth and the Southern Ocean shores. To bypass them, an 11.2 km (7.0 mi) railway line – the first full-scale railway in Australia – was built from Goolwa to Port Elliot, where ocean-going vessels docked. The line opened in 1854.  

The grave mistake in choosing Port Elliot as a harbour soon became apparent: by 1864, seven ships at anchor had been wrecked. Port Victor, later named Victor Harbor, 4 miles (6 km) to the west, was a much safer seaport. In that year, therefore, a jetty and pier were built at Port Victor and the railway line was extended west to the town to reach them. At the same time, the people of Strathalbyn and surrounding areas successfully applied political pressure to build a line connecting their town to the eastern end of the railway. The line was completed in 1869.

Railways draw off the river trade

By the end of the 1870s, in the same way that river boats had revolutionised the transport of produce, steam trains rapidly cut into their market. Produce brought from the upper reaches by boat could be hastened to Port Adelaide by rail without needing to continue on the river to the lower reaches. The opening of one railway in particular had a huge impact on lower River Murray ports: the line to Morgan, which was extended from Kapunda in 1878, provided a connection with the state capital. Since Morgan was 306 km (190 mi) and up to a week's journey by river from Goolwa, but only 160 km (100 mi) of faster transit by rail to Adelaide, the town almost immediately eclipsed Goolwa as the busiest riverport in South Australia. The smaller settlement of Wellington, 63 km (39 mi) upstream from Goolwa, was similarly overtaken when a railway from Adelaide arrived at nearby Murray Bridge the following year.

Throughout this period of change, primary producers in the Murray mouth region were disadvantaged by the comparatively higher costs of either transporting produce overland to Adelaide by dray or by coastal shipping, since the Port Victor line had not been extended further north than Strathalbyn. Eventually the South Australian parliament appointed a select committee to investigate building a connecting line of about 30 km (20 mi)  from Strathalbyn to the Adelaide–Melbourne line then under construction.

Political push for Milang (and Mr Landseer)
One of the select committee members was a prominent and highly respected  Member of Parliament, Albert Landseer. In 1856 he had founded Milang, where he continued to have his headquarters, and he was renowned for his intimate connection with the town and district. His business interests in the area – including flour milling, ownership of river steamers and barges, agent for the paddle steamer pioneer Francis Cadell, and wool warehousing – were immense. As the senior representative for Mount Barker since 1875 he had become highly prominent in public life – "almost a household word". He made sure the committee heard evidence supporting a branch line to Milang that would allow steamboats to use what he considered to be a more conveniently located railhead than Goolwa, despite unfavourable assessment as early as 22 years beforehand. 

So it was that in November 1881, when assent was granted to an Act  – short title The Mount Barker and Strathalbyn Railway Act  – it authorised not only a link to Mount Barker but the branch line from Sandergrove to Milang that Landseer had been seeking.  When the line was opened, a newspaper report started with a remark that the branch was "jocularly styled 'Landseer's line'".

The "palmy days" of river trade were over, however, by the mid-1880s. Morgan's primacy over the downstream ports – after the completion of its rail link with Adelaide – was well established and the trade itself was on the eve of decline.

The line is built 

Tenders were called for building the line to Strathalbyn and the branch to Milang in April 1882. The company of Walker and Swann (builders of the first section of the Intercolonial Railway between Adelaide and Aldgate that opened in March 1883) were awarded the contract for both lines and signed the papers in June 1882. The contract price was £143,678 for the main line (20 per cent lower than the survey estimate of £155,000) and £25,600 for the branch line. 

Five hundred men started building the main line from Mount Barker junction via Philcox Hill to Strathalbyn in November 1883, completing it in September 1884. The first load of wool was consigned from Mr A. McFarlane's property at Milang to A.H. Landseer's store at Port Adelaide. By late August, the workforce transferred en masse to the Milang branch, on which earthworks had been completed and all that was needed was to lay the rails and steel sleepers, and perform ballasting operations. The branch opened three months later, on 17 December 1884 – the same day as the line from Strathalbyn to Goolwa changed over from horse to steam power. No ceremony was performed but the public were given free rides and a special train brought invited guests from Strathalbyn, stopping almost halfway between Sandergrove and Milang for a picnic in the scrub, followed by entertainment at Milang's institute hall in the late afternoon.

Traffic

The Milang terminus comprised a main line, passing siding and stock siding; the goods siding was an extension of the main line. A 16.2 m (53 ft) human-propelled turntable was provided to turn locomotives and railcars. Narrow gauge (1067 mm, 3 ft 6 ins) track was laid from its longstanding location at the jetty to the station, and all goods from river vessels – plus fish, since Milang was a flourishing fishing centre – were transferred on to broad-gauge vehicles at the wharf end of the station yard. Facilities on the way to Milang were minimal: at Sandergrove junction there was a platform and small shed; at Nurragi a passing loop about 70 metres (230 feet) long, a very short platform, and a small shed; and at Punkulde a passenger stopping sign where the Finniss to Milang road crossed the line.

Traffic of wool and supplies up and down the Murray in the early years of the Milang branch resulted in steady business, even if not large-scale. However, from 1929, when road transportation was deregulated and the economic slump of the previous two years deepened, traffic declined and did not recover. In 1931 the Transport Control Board asked the South Australian Railways to provide a report on the estimated savings to be made by closure of unprofitable branchlines, including those south of Mount Barker. Closure was averted by the prospect of heavy expenditure being needed to upgrade roads for heavy goods transport and by the expectation of impending increases in revenue following the severe drought of 1928–29 and an expected waning of the economic depression. Repeal of the 1930 Road and Railways Transport Act in 1964 exposed the railways to intense competition from road transport and reduced traffic severely. The line stumbled on for another six years before it closed.

Other than in the early years, safety in train operation was secured by the train order system. A mixed (freight and passenger) steam-hauled train provided the service from Strathalbyn until 1925, when new Brill Model 55 railcars  commenced running daily between Adelaide and Milang. A goods train worked several times a week from Strathalbyn. By the late 1930s, a larger Brill Model 75 railcar stationed at Strathalbyn worked all Milang services except for a weekly locomotive-hauled train. From 1942 to 1968, all goods and livestock traffic was in four-wheeled vehicles towed by the railcar.  In 1968 (the year the passenger service was halted), legislative protection of goods traffic on the South Australian Railways ceased and traffic plummeted on the line. Motive power for solely goods traffic was then provided on demand by mainline trains doubling back from Sandergrove or Strathalbyn as necessary until the line was closed two years later.

The maximum speed permitted on the line was 30 mph (48 km/h), but a journalist taken on a train just before the line opened enthused: 

In 1969, a review by the Transport Control Board found that even on the Strathalbyn–Victor Harbor line, a total of only 4,500 passengers had boarded at stations during the previous year; closure of the lines south of Strathalbyn was recommended. The Parliamentary Standing Committee on Public Works then recommended an attempt be made to reinvigorate freight traffic rather than immediate closure of the main route, but recommended closure of the Milang branch. By then, although goods trains had operated occasionally, the last timetabled passenger service had run, on 30 November 1968. A special charter trip was operated on 15 June 1970, two days before the line was formally closed.

Milang railway museum 

The Milang Historical Railway Museum, which opened in 1992, has become one of Milang's major attractions. After the line was closed, the track and structures had been removed; the wooden station building was purchased and used for 20 years as an outbuilding on a farm. Subsequently, it was donated to the museum and members transported it back to its original site, to become the centrepiece of the museum on a new platform. All track and ballast had been removed, so museum members acquired and installed components that allowed them to replicate the previous track layout.

Railway memorabilia and displays of the railway-era history of the town and surrounding districts are situated in the building and in several items of rolling stock next to the platform. An innovative feature in the cab of a static-display diesel locomotive cab is a computer operated driving simulator that visitors can operate. In the station building the focus is on the South Australian Railways and the importance of the railway to the district. On display are many old photos and railway memorabilia.

The story of the light railways of South Australia – of which there were about 700, operating in mines, forests, wineries, munitions factories and quarries, and at jetties to transport goods from ships – is also told on many wall displays, and models of rolling stock that ran on those railways are adjacent. Visitors can operate a model light railway. Outside In the station yard, three historic light railway locomotives and two section cars are on display. This aspect of the museum, operating under the name of the South Australian Light Railway Centre, is the result of collaboration between museum members, the Light Railway Research Society of Australia and the History Trust of South Australia.

The Museum published a book about the line, The Lakes Railway, in 2018.

Rail trail (Nurragi conservation reserve)

The right-of-way of the former railway line was declared in 1991 as the Nurragi Conservation Reserve, permanently protected by a native vegetation heritage agreement. Linking the eastern  Mount Lofty Ranges and Lake Alexandrina, it contains extremely important remnant native vegetation in a region that has been cleared of more than 98 per cent of its original cover.

More than 300 native plant species are present in the conservation reserve, of which more than 50 are of particular conservation significance. A community group, the Friends of Nurragi Association, has worked to re-establish flora indigenous to the Milang Scrub, which originally extended from Belvidere in the north to Point Sturt in the south and Finniss to the west; local primary school children have also taken part. Bare areas are being revegetated with species of the original Milang Scrub, including Aboriginal food plants such as muntries, quandongs and native currants. The reserve is also an important link for wildlife and birds between the lakeside environment and the foothills, providing them with food and protective cover.

Notes

References

External links
Milang Historical Railway Museum Inc.
Friends of Nurragi Association Inc.
Nurragi Conservation Reserve walker's guide
Nurragi Conservation Reserve

Closed railway lines in South Australia
Railway lines opened in 1884
Railway lines closed in 1970
Railway lines in South Australia